Apollonos Hieron ("Temple of Apollo") was an ancient city of Lydia.

Location
It was located about 300 stadia from Pergamon on a hill, but is exact location is unknown

The inhabitants of the village of Buldan hold that their town is the location, of Apollonos Hieron. However, Buldan is known to be the  site of Tripolis, and both cities sent separate delegates to the Council of Chalcedon. Ramsay believed that both cities were adjacent to each other and this may explain why Pliny thought the name of Tripolis had previously been Apollonos. He more generally puts it in the Plain of Philadelphia, in the Lykos River Valley,

Apollonos Hieron was known for its temple, and is mentioned by Pliny, who describes it as small. It is possibly mentioned by Aristides and Strabo. Apollonos Hieron minted its own coins, of which there are today many examples.

Bishopric
Apollonos Hieron was also the seat of a bishopric and remains a titular see in the Roman Catholic Church. Bishop Leucius of Apollonos Hieron signed at the Council of Chalcedon.

References

Ancient Greek archaeological sites in Turkey
Catholic titular sees in Asia
Dioceses established in the 1st century
Greek colonies in Anatolia
Populated places in ancient Lydia
Former populated places in Turkey
Temples of Apollo
History of Denizli Province